General elections were held in Costa Rica on 14 February 1932. Ricardo Jiménez Oreamuno of the Independent National Republican Party won the presidential election, whilst the party also won the parliamentary election, in which they received 46.7% of the vote. Voter turnout was 64.2%.

Campaign
In 1931 Ricardo Jiménez Oreamuno is proclaimed in absentia presidential nominee in the National Republican Party’s convention where an incident happens without much consequences; four people shout "Long live the Communist Party!"

When informed that he has been elected candidate Jiménez says he will think about it, because he is reluctant, withdrawn from politics on his farm, says he would accept only if he has enough citizen support and economic support from others. The diverse republican factions (all claiming to be heirs of the historic Republican Party of Máximo Fernández) were divided looking for candidates. Alberto Echandi Montero of the Agricultural Party and León Cortés Castro of the Republican are rumored as possible candidates, but in the end they give up.

For his part, the plenipotentiary minister in the United States, Manuel Castro Quesada, asks for a license and returns to the country with political aspirations. This generates a protest inside the cabinet of Cleto González Víquez that votes in favor of dismissing Castro, with the negative vote from the Secretary of Public Safety and son-in-law of González, Arturo Quirós Carranza. The matter is brought to the public light, which provokes the resignation of the secretaries who led the destitution of Castro; Tomás Soley Güell, Gregorio Escalante and Octavio Beeche. Gonzalez's resignation was rumored, but it did not happen.

The oppositionist Leon Cortes (whose name means lion in Spanish) raised strong accusations against the government and against Castro whom he accused of being a puppet of the government. Castro replied:

Following the scandal and the ministerial crisis, Jiménez Oreamuno announces that he is declining his candidacy. This generates new interested in politics. The Agricultural, Republican and Constitutional parties offer the candidacy to Carlos María Jiménez Ortiz, who nevertheless declines.

Castro Quesada is a candidate for the Republican Union Party, supported by the presidents Máximo Fernández Alvarado and Alfredo González Flores, bankers, ranchers (including future presidential candidate Fernando Castro Cervantes), intellectuals and the vestiges of the Reformist Party. On the other hand, Jiménez Oreamuno accepts the candidacy finally on July 16, which generates a manifestation of spontaneous celebration in Cartago. He accepted after reaching an agreement with Echandi and Cortés, his former political adversaries.

Meanwhile, the Republican Club selects Carlos María Jiménez as its candidate. In addition, the new Nationalist Party of the businessman of German descent, Maximiliano Koberg Bolandi, participates.

The campaign was impregnated with attacks referring to the actions of the parties during the Tinoquista coup of 1917. Jiménez Oreamuno was accused of not having been a real opponent of Tinoco, while Castro Quesada and his ally González Flores (the president overthrown by Tinoco), Jiménez accused them of seeking US intervention.

Jorge Volio Jiménez affirms to be in favor of returning to the public vote (which had been abolished in 1925 and replaced by the secret vote) what many liberals consider a step backwards in democratic reforms. Volio also affirms to be in favor of the Female Suffrage to which Jiménez is opposed assuring that the women are not freethinkers and they will vote by who says the Church.

Results

President

Parliament

References

1932 elections in Central America
1932 in Costa Rica
Elections in Costa Rica